Actinochaetopteryx patellipalpis is a species of parasitic fly in the family Tachinidae.

Distribution
Russia.

References

Diptera of Asia
Dexiinae
Insects described in 1986
Insects of Russia